Drapery is a general word referring to cloths or textiles (Old French , from Late Latin ).  It may refer to cloth used for decorative purposes – such as around windows – or to the trade of retailing cloth, originally mostly for clothing, formerly conducted by drapers.

Drape 
Drape (draping or fabric drape) is the property of different textile materials how they fold, fall, or hang over a three-dimensional body. Draping depends upon the fiber characteristics and the flexibility, looseness, and softness of the material. Draped garments follow the form of the human body beneath them.

Art 

In art history, drapery refers to any cloth or textile depicted, which is usually clothing. The schematic depiction of the folds and woven patterns of loose-hanging clothing on the human form, with ancient prototypes, was reimagined as an adjunct to the female form by Greek vase-painters and sculptors of the earliest fifth century and has remained a major source of stylistic formulas in sculpture and painting, even after the Renaissance adoption of tighter-fitting clothing styles.  After the Renaissance, large cloths with no very obvious purpose are often used decoratively, especially in portraits in the grand manner; these are also known as draperies.

For the Greeks, as Kenneth Clark noted, clinging drapery followed the planes and contours of the bodily form, emphasizing its twist and stretch: "floating drapery makes visible the line of movement through which it has just passed.... Drapery, by suggesting lines of force, indicates for each action a past and a possible future." Clark contrasted the formalized draperies in the frieze at Olympia with the sculptural frieze figures of the Parthenon, where "it has attained a freedom and an expressive power that have never been equalled except by Leonardo da Vinci". Undraped male figures, Clark observed, "were kept in motion by their flying cloaks."

In 18th century England, many of the leading portrait painters with a large workshop engaged the services of drapery painters, who were specialists who painted the dress, costumes and other accessories worn by the sitters in portrait paintings. While the portraitist completed the face and hands, the drapery painter was responsible for the pose and costume.  These specialists were not necessarily assistants in the workshop of the portrait painters but rather subcontractors. The Flemish painter Joseph van Aken was the leading drapery painter in 18th century England working for most portrait artists and as a consequence many of the works of English portrait artists of that period are often difficult to distinguish one from another.

Interior design 
In interior design, drapery refers almost exclusively to window treatments. It is often used as a focal point alongside the windows or as a way to help block sun/glare. There is general agreement that drapery in design is more substantial and weightier than other window treatments, such as curtain paneling. Drapes are also normally lined, whereas curtain panels normally are not. You can have drapery that is sheer, light filtering, room darkening or blackout; so they can be used in almost every room of the house if desired. Drapery is also considered a relatively permanent installation, adding an integral element to the room's design by adding color or pattern to complement the rest of the architectural and soft elements.

Gallery

See also 
Master of the Drapery Studies

Notes 

Interior design
Furnishings
Art history
Properties of textiles